The United Kingdom Clinical Pharmacy Association (UKCPA) is a non-profit organisation which actively develops clinical pharmacy practice in medicines management.

History 
The organisation was founded in Leicester in 1981 in response to a need to drive clinical pharmacy practice forward in the UK. The organisation is currently focused to support and encourage excellence, leadership and partnership within clinical pharmacy.

Functions 
The UKCPA supports pharmacy practitioners to develop and deliver clinical pharmacy.

The organisation provides the infrastructure to enable pharmacy practitioner peers to deliver professional education and training across a diverse range of practice interest areas (e.g. infection management, anticoagulation, diabetes/endocrinology, pain management, GP practice, critical care, etc).  The UKCPA is organised to build and support communities of practice around interest areas - practitioners can talk to each other on a daily basis in order to solve individual clinical problems or create systems, methods and guidelines to deal with clinical scenarios on a local, regional or even national basis.

The UKCPA holds education and training events throughout the UK. The content is provided by coal face clinical practitioners and targeted at various levels of practice, from beginners to expert. The events are accredited by the Royal Pharmaceutical Society.  Peer-reviewed research posters are displayed at annual conference.

The UKCPA draws on its membership to provide expertise on the use of medicines to national organisations such as NICE, the Department of Health the MHRA, and other professional organisations. 

Expert members are involved in developing professional curricula for workforce development, developing assessment of advanced practice, and are assessors for the Royal Pharmaceutical Society Faculty. The UKCPA is a partner of the Royal Pharmaceutical Society, the professional body for the pharmacy profession in England, Wales and Scotland.

The UKCPA provides a research grant to support its members to develop their research skills. This grant is provided in partnership with Pharmacy Research UK.

Membership 
The UKCPA currently has more than 2,500 members in the UK and overseas from all areas of the profession including hospital, community, academia, and industry, as well as pharmacists and pharmacy technicians working at the interface between primary and secondary care.

Structure 
The UKCPA is largely run by volunteers – the practitioners themselves. Most UKCPA officers (chair, vice-chair and treasurer) are working pharmacy practitioners. The general secretary and general manager are employed by UKCPA. The general committee makes strategic and financial decisions on behalf of the membership. The business management group makes executive decisions and approves expenditure in consultation with the general committee.
 
The UKCPA head office is in Leicester where the general manager and administrative team are based.

Interest groups 

 Cardiology
 Care of the Elderly
 Community
 Critical Care
 Diabetes and Endocrinology
 Education and Training
 Emergency Care
 Foundation Pharmacists
 Gastroenterology and Hepatology
 GP Practice Pharmacists
 Haemostasis, Anticoagulation and Thrombosis
 Independent Prescribing
 Information Technology
 Medicines Safety and Quality
 Neurosciences
 Pain Management
 Pharmacy Infection Network
 Respiratory
 Rheumatology and Dermatology
 Surgery and Theatres
 Women's Health

References 

Health in Leicestershire
Organisations based in Leicestershire
Pharmacy organisations in the United Kingdom